Anyanka Christina Emmanuella "Anya" Jenkins (born as Aud) is a fictional character created by Joss Whedon for the television series Buffy the Vampire Slayer. She also appears in the comic book series based on the television show. Portrayed by Emma Caulfield, the character appears as a recurring star in the third and fourth seasons of the show before becoming a series regular in the show's fifth, sixth, and seventh seasons. The character made her last television appearance in 2003, appearing in the series finale of the show that aired on May 20, 2003.

Within the series' narrative, Anya was originally a human named Aud, but spent over a thousand years as Anyanka, a vengeance demon, wreaking havoc by granting the wishes of women who had been wronged by men. The character becomes human again in her first appearance, and is forced to learn what it means to be human again in subsequent episodes. Primarily, this is used by the writers for comic relief; Anya has a very poor sense of what behaviors are appropriate, and speaks very bluntly and honestly. However, the writers have also used this for more poignant purposes, such as when Anya finds herself struggling to deal with death. Flashbacks show that Anyanka's manner was much the same before she became a demon. Over a decade after being killed in the series finale, Anya returned as a ghost in the canonical comic book series Buffy the Vampire Slayer Season Ten.

Character history

Backstory
Anyanka "Anya" Jenkins was born as Aud in the 9th century in Sjornjost, a small Scandinavian village. Aud grew up raising rabbits and became an outsider in her community, which dismissed her as "odd", because of her strange mannerisms and out-of-the-ordinary ideas (such as not wanting to sell the rabbits she had been breeding, but instead giving them to people in the village as gifts). She eventually falls in love with the boorish Olaf, a Viking warrior who enjoys hunting trolls and drinking at the bar. In 880, a furious Aud discovers that Olaf has cheated on her with a bar matron named Rannveig, and takes her revenge on him by using magic to transform him into a troll. Aud had previously used magic against her past lovers as well, casting spells to create boils on the penis, for example, but this act of vengeance against Olaf attracts the attention of the demon D'Hoffryn, who offers to transform her into a vengeance demon for scorned women. D'Hoffryn gives Aud the new name Anyanka, Patron Saint of Scorned Women, and a pendant which gives her the power to grant wishes.

Around 1199, Anyanka goes to the Koskov valleys above the Urals to curse an unfaithful man. She witnesses a sorcerer's Ascension into pure demon form. The death and carnage — only a few people survive — shock even her. Around 1580, Anyanka meets (and dates) Dracula, and later is in Salem, Massachusetts, during the witch trials of 1692.

In the 19th century, Anyanka becomes a close friend and fierce competitor of the vengeance demon known as Halfrek, whose specialty is avenging wronged children. They spend time together during the Crimean War. Anyanka impresses "Hallie" with a granted wish in Saint Petersburg, Russia, that sparks a revolution in 1905. In 1914, Anyanka travels to Chicago, Illinois, to exact vengeance on a man named Stewart Burns, turning him into a demon and sending him to a hell dimension to be tortured for all eternity.

Storylines as a recurring character
Anyanka arrives at Sunnydale High in 1998 (in the episode "The Wish") as a student named Anya Emerson. She came to Sunnydale in response to the distress of Cordelia, who is upset after catching her boyfriend, Xander Harris, kissing their friend Willow. After some prompting, Cordelia states: "I wish that Buffy Summers had never come to Sunnydale." Anya shows her true demon face to Cordelia and says, "Done." The world changes into an alternative reality in which Buffy has not come to Sunnydale and the vampire population has multiplied and gained in power. Giles meets with Cordelia before she dies and manages to discern what has happened. He subsequently summons Anyanka and destroys her necklace. As a result, Anya is made a mortal and powerless human again and the world returns to normal.

Caulfield said, "As far as I know, I don't think Joss Whedon ever intended to have Anya around for more than one episode." However, Anya returns in the episode "Doppelgangland", duping Willow into assisting in a failed magical attempt to recover the necklace which was her power center, lost when Giles destroyed it to reverse the wish granted for Cordelia. When these efforts fail, she is forced to continue living as a typical high school student. Now with human feelings, she yearns to attend the school prom in spite of her abhorrence of all men; ironically, her only hope for a date is the last man she was sent to punish, Xander. Caulfield says, "[Whedon] found this great way to have her interact with the storylines that had developed throughout the entire [third] season."

Anya develops feelings for Xander and asks him out again just before graduation, even though Xander showed no interest in her. Her romantic plans are foiled when he tells her of the Mayor's plan for his own "Ascension", a transformation into pure demon, at the graduation ceremony. Anya decides to flee Sunnydale and invites Xander to join her, saying when she thinks something could happen to him, she "feels bad inside, like [she] might vomit". Xander refuses because he's got "friends on the line", and can't abandon them. She leaves without him.

Anya returns to Sunnydale early in Season Four, still infatuated with Xander. She seduces him (in the episode "The Harsh Light of Day"). Her lack of experience with people causes her to make straightforward, often tactless remarks, which soon put her at odds with other Scooby Gang members, especially Willow, who has little trust for the ex-demon. Anya's tactlessness is played both for humor and to highlight the truth in situations where others are reluctant to be frank. This is seen most poignantly in "The Body" when her inability to comprehend Buffy's mother's death leads to inappropriate remarks which at first make others angry, but then allow for catharsis and comfort.

Storylines as a regular cast member
Anya becomes a regular in Season Five of the show. While playing The Game of Life, she discovers her love for money and capitalism (as opposed to her belief in Communism during the early 20th century and her charitable attitude of her years as Aud). Anya's budding retail skills encourage Giles to hire her as a cashier at The Magic Box. In the episode, "Checkpoint", Anya is questioned by members of the Watchers' Council, and invents the full name Anya Christina Emmanuella Jenkins, and claims to have been born on the Fourth of July in Indiana.

During an impending apocalypse, brought about by Glory at the end of Season Five, Xander proposes to Anya and they are engaged for most of Season Six. Xander's doubts grow, however, and it is not difficult for Stewart Burns - escaped from Hell and impersonating Xander's future self - to persuade him to leave Anya at the wedding by showing him an illusionary life where Anya apparently cheats on Xander and is later killed in an argument between the two ("Hell's Bells"). Grief-stricken, Anya is vulnerable to D'Hoffryn's coaxing, and becomes a vengeance demon again.

In the Season Six episode "Entropy" Anya returns to Sunnydale. The audience can see her as a vengeance demon but the other characters are unaware until "Villains". Anya cannot find anyone who wishes vengeance on Xander and so she takes comfort in sex with Spike, an act which puts her relationship and friendship with Xander and Buffy in jeopardy. Spike nearly wishes for some kind of vengeance upon Xander, but after seeing how much her actions hurt him, Anya stops him, unable to go through with it. In the Season Six finale, Willow destroys The Magic Box, leaving Anya jobless in the mortal world. Anya does not enjoy her return to being a vengeance demon—her experience as a human has led to empathy, which makes exacting vengeance too painful for her to manage. She spends a summer granting half-hearted wishes and gains a reputation among demons as "Miss Soft-Serve".

When asked what direction she would like to see Anya's character go, Emma Caulfield said she hoped that in Season Seven Anya would become "kind of a badass". Caulfield said that Anya has always been strong in unorthodox ways, but "I'd like to see a more blatant display of her strength." Appropriately, after Halfrek encourages Anya to return to her former level of work, Anya exacts a terrible vengeance on a group of college boys by unleashing a spider-like Grimslaw demon on them. This results in a battle with Buffy, in which they are almost evenly matched. The battle is interrupted when D'Hoffryn, summoned by Willow from the Summers home, shows up. D'Hoffryn asks Anya what she wants, and she asks that her vengeance be reversed. D'Hoffryn tells her the price will be the life of a vengeance demon; Anya agrees, assuming it is she who will die, but D'Hoffryn summons Halfrek, incinerating her before Anya. "Never go for the kill, when you can go for the pain" he tells the distressed Anya, and strips her of her powers, making her once again mortal.

Anya decides that she has been too dependent on others and resolves to find an independent purpose in life for herself. She eventually rejoins the Scooby Gang as Season Seven focuses on the long fight against the First Evil and eventually becomes friends with Xander; although Xander and Anya still love each other, they never officially resume their relationship.

In the series finale, "Chosen", Anya fights with the others in the climactic battle against the First Evil and is brutally slain from behind, bisected by a Bringer's sword. Her body lies in the school's remains although Xander attempts to locate her while fleeing the collapsing building. After Sunnydale collapses into the Hellmouth, Andrew Wells comforts Xander by telling him that Anya had died saving his life, to which Xander tearfully replies, "That's my girl, always doing the stupid thing."

In an interview with Buffy The Vampire Slayer/Angel magazine #93, Emma Caulfield stated that she was okay with her character's abrupt death, stating, "She didn't get a big, maudlin send-off, it was very quick and to the point - very Anya in that respect." Although later, at Wizard World Philadelphia 2009 she said she didn't realize it was going to be abrupt and without fanfare, and would have appreciated a little something more.

Joss Whedon joked at the Nocturnal convention in 2001 Anya was originally supposed to die during the Season Five finale, "The Gift", but he had to keep her alive because Emma Caulfield couldn't keep still while Xander was carrying Anya's supposedly lifeless body.

Comic book series
It was stated that Anya would return in the Buffy the Vampire Slayer Season Eight comic book series, even with Joss Whedon telling MTV that she was "definitely dead... but that doesn't mean she's gone." However, Dark Horse Comics editor Scott Allie stated that there were no current plans for Anya to appear.

In the first issue of Buffy the Vampire Slayer Season Ten, Anya returns as a ghost, having a conversation with Xander during a battle with both a mindless breed of vampires, which Xander has dubbed "zompires," and another new breed who are stronger and has abilities of withstanding sunlight and shape-shifting. Currently, she is only visible to her former fiancé, and Xander hasn't yet informed the gang about Anya. It soon turns out she was a fake ghost who was created by D'Hoffryn who wanted revenge on Xander. Anya's fake ghost realizes that the one thing Anya wanted before she died was taking care of D'Hoffryn. D'Hoffryn was pulling Anya's strings for a long time, even when she was human. She never cut her strings and finally got her vengeance on D'Hoffryn and knew that Xander felt bad about what happened between him and Anya. Before departing, she assures Xander that he is a good man and that the original Anya would forgive him as well.

Powers and abilities
Anyanka has the power to grant wishes made by women seeking revenge against men who have wronged them, even changing reality to accommodate these wishes, a gift which is supported by her ability to detect women's emotional pain at a distance. She has supernatural strength, teleportation (although in "Same Time, Same Place" she mentions that her use of teleportation is temporarily limited and requires bureaucratic paperwork), telekinesis and rapid healing, being able to survive impalement. As a demon she will not die of old age, having lived over a thousand years, but can be killed if her body is sufficiently damaged.

With over a thousand years of experience as a former vengeance demon, Anya's knowledge of demonology and various dimensions is immense, surpassing both Giles and his successor Wesley Wyndam-Pryce, but not as skilled as them in research. Although her native language is Old Norse, Anyanka/Anya speaks fluent English as well as some French, Latin and can read and speak Ancient Sumerian. It is implied that she can speak any human language, as she has granted wishes in many countries all over the world throughout many centuries. Despite being human, Anya still has contacts with some of her former associates.

Anya also exhibits some basic knowledge of magic, often commenting on Willow's spellcasting and interest in magic with a reasonable degree of insight, and she occasionally participates in the casting of spells herself ("Doppelgangland"). As a human, Anya's experience and practice of combat from her time as a demon allows her to be an effective fighter, as seen in the series finale.

As a ghost, Anya is incorporeal and invisible to everyone except Xander.

Personality
Commenting on the personality of her character, Caulfield said, "Anya remains mortal and ambivalent. She's just struggling with being human, and really, don't we all struggle with that from time to time? She's very indifferent - and definitely sarcastic and bitter at times." Anya states in the "Selfless" flashback that she likes to bowl and she's "good with math".

Bunny phobia
Anya's irrational fear of rabbits (leporiphobia) is established for the first time in the Season Four Halloween episode "Fear, Itself", in which she appears in a bunny costume after Xander tells her to come to the party as something "scary". Her phobia becomes a running joke for the remainder of the series. In "The Gift", Anya sees a stuffed rabbit in the basement of The Magic Box (while looking for the Dagon Sphere with Xander), causing her to scream and exclaim, "Who would put something like that there?!" In "Once More, With Feeling", Anya sings, "Bunnies aren't just cute like everybody supposes. They got them hoppy legs and twitchy little noses, and what's with all the carrots? What do they need such good eyesight for anyway?", a verse reminiscent of Willow's speech about spiders ("Nightmares"). In "Tabula Rasa", while suffering from memory loss, she repeatedly casts a spell that does nothing more than cause rabbits to appear in increasing numbers. The phobia also manifests itself in her final moments. As the final battle approaches, Andrew Wells suggests she "picture happy things: a lake, candy canes, bunnies..." The change is drastic and instantaneous. She confidently raises her sword, saying grimly, "Bunnies. Floppy, hoppy, bunnies."

In her "origins" episode, "Selfless", Anya (then known as Aud), is surrounded by rabbits without showing any signs of distress over their presence.

Academic analysis
Anya has been the subject of at least one academic article. For Tamy Burnett, "Anya ... stands alone as the only woman in the Buffyverse to remain unshamed and unpunished for her expressions of sexuality". Burnett argues that, among Buffys female characters, despite their varying versions of personal and/or mental strength, Anya is the only one who is truly sexually liberated. Buffy and her friends tend to be "girly girls", who learn that "Sex is bad" and have their transgressions of traditional gender performance punished; Burnett cites the loss of Angel's soul,  punitive interpretations of Tara's death, and Willow's transformation into Warren among other consequences. Faith comes "the closest" after Anya to breaking these traditional patterns because, while she is "just as sexual and outspoken" as Anya, she pivotally does not achieve Anya's acceptance within the group; for Anya, this "legitimizes her perspective". She identifies this motif with typical traits of horror fiction, citing Dawn Heinecken's feminist analysis in Warrior Women of Television. Anya frankly admits to masturbation and to her favourite sexual activities with Xander, and assumes that others share her attitudes. To Burnett, Anya's death in "Chosen" positions Anya as "failing to achieve [her] ultimate narrative legitimacy". Burnett concludes that "Anya's attitude toward sexual desire marks her as transgressing traditional forms of female sexuality, a significant break to the pattern by which other women on the show are constrained."

Appearances
Buffy the Vampire Slayer: Anya appeared in 81 canon episodes. Anya was a series regular from Seasons Five through Seven (2000–2003), but did not appear in "Normal Again", "Help" (her scenes were cut), "Conversations with Dead People", and "Dirty Girls". Prior to Season Five, Anya was a recurring character for seasons three to four, appearing in the following episodes:

 Season Three (1998–1999): "The Wish", "Doppelgangland", "The Prom" and "Graduation Day, Part One".
 Season Four (1999–2000): "The Harsh Light of Day", "Fear, Itself", "Pangs", "Something Blue", "Hush", "A New Man", "The I in Team", "Goodbye Iowa", "Who Are You", "Superstar", "Where the Wild Things Are", "New Moon Rising", "The Yoko Factor", "Primeval", and "Restless".

Anya has also appeared in a number of comics including Past Lives, Ugly Little Monsters, and Reunion, and in novels including Unseen, Wisdom of War and Monster Island. She also makes a brief appearance in the 2003 video game Buffy the Vampire Slayer: Chaos Bleeds.

Merchandise
In 2005, Diamond Select Toys produced several action figures in the likeness of Emma Caulfield for their Buffy the Vampire Slayer line. Each figure featured a "real-scan" likeness of Caulfield and episode/character specific outfit. Figures produced were: "Season 5 Anya" in red top and black skirt, "Hell's Bells Anya" in wedding dress, "Once More, With Feeling Anya" in butterfly top and green skirt, "Anyanka" in demon dress, and "Bunny Suit Anya" in removable bunny suit. A repaint of "Bunny Suit Anya" was featured in the Vengeance Book box-set.

References

External links

 Anya on IMDb

Buffy the Vampire Slayer characters
Buffyverse characters who use magic
Buffyverse demons
Female characters in television
Television characters introduced in 1998
Fictional characters who can teleport
Fictional mass murderers
Fictional shopkeepers
Fictional immigrants to the United States
Fictional demon hunters
Fictional ghosts
Fictional telekinetics
Fictional characters with superhuman strength
Fictional Swedish people
Female characters in comics